In mathematics, the Jacobi triple product is the mathematical identity:

for complex numbers x and y, with |x| < 1 and y ≠ 0.

The Jacobi triple product identity is the  Macdonald identity for the affine root system of type A1, and is the Weyl denominator formula for the corresponding affine Kac–Moody algebra.

Properties 

The basis of Jacobi's proof relies on Euler's pentagonal number theorem, which is itself a specific case of the Jacobi Triple Product Identity.

Then we have

The Jacobi Triple Product also allows the Jacobi theta function to be written as an infinite product as follows:

Let  and 

Then the Jacobi theta function

can be written in the form

Using the Jacobi Triple Product Identity we can then write the theta function as the product

There are many different notations used to express the Jacobi triple product.  It  takes on a concise form when expressed in terms of q-Pochhammer symbols:

where  is the infinite q-Pochhammer symbol.

It enjoys a particularly elegant form when expressed in terms of the Ramanujan theta function.  For  it can be written as

Proof

Let 

which satisfies 

so that

and hence

Evaluating  
Showing that  is technical. One way is to set  and show both the numerator and the denominator of

are weight 1/2 modular under , since they are also 1-periodic and bounded on the upper half plane the quotient has to be constant so that .

Other proofs 
A different proof is given by G. E. Andrews based on two identities of Euler.

For the analytic case, see Apostol.

References

 Peter J. Cameron, Combinatorics: Topics, Techniques, Algorithms, (1994) Cambridge University Press, 

Elliptic functions
Theta functions
Mathematical identities
Theorems in number theory
Infinite products